is a Japanese slice of life romance shōjo manga series written and illustrated by Nao Maita. It began serialization in August 2012 in Shogakukan's Ciao manga magazine and ended in October 2019. It was published in twenty volumes. The manga was adapted into an original video animation that was released in April 2014 and it was also adapted into a video game and a TV anime series released in 2016.

Plot
Hanabi Ayase and her best friend, Yui Aoi, are 6th graders in school. When Hanabi is chosen to work with Yuuto Takao for an upcoming test, she begins to fall in love with him and they both start dating. Yui also falls in love with Kazuma Hiyama, after he protects her from a classmate who talked about Yui behind her back, and they start dating as well.

Characters

Main characters

Hanabi is the first protagonist of the series along with Yui and is part of a three-girl clique with Yui and Marin. She is very child-like, from her appearance to her behaviour, with her two signature pigtails and innocent charm that makes her oblivious to the boys' actions in class unless it is very obvious. She gets close to Yuuto during a music session when their homeroom teacher required them to partner with the classmate they are sitting beside, which happened to be him. Initially oblivious towards his feelings for her, she finally develops feelings for him when they share their first kiss. She has a bit of a one-sided rivalry with Cocoa, who is the most popular girl in class and wants to be Yuuto's girlfriend, as she believes them to be a perfect couple.

 (OVA); Juri Kimura (TV series)
Yui is the second protagonist of the series along with Hanabi and is part of a three-girl clique along with Hanabi and Marin. She is developing both physically and mentally the earliest out of the group, but is still insecure due to the presence of not having a mother around to help, so she often asks Marin. Projecting a model student air, Yui initially dislikes Hiyama due to his delinquent-like attitude and his hobby of teasing her, but grew to like him after he spent a long time trying to find something important for her that she lost.

Yuuto is Hanabi's boyfriend and is very affectionate of her. He is the most popular boy in school, and that is matched with his good looks and mature appearance that makes almost all the girls, especially Cocoa, fawn over him. He develops feelings for Hanabi early in the story and kisses her on the rooftop. They start going out and become Class 6-2's first actual couple.

 (OVA/game); Shun Horie (TV series)
Kazuma starts off as a delinquent-like prankster and a rash speaker, but actually has a soft side to him. Having a crush on Yui early in the series, he covers it up by teasing her and leading a group of three boys to do foolish antics to rile her, but stopped soon after. He helps Yui find a precious item that she lost and confesses when she does so too. They start going out and become Class 6-2's second couple after Hanabi and Yuuto.

Supporting characters

Hanabi and Yui's best friend and makes up the three-girl clique along with them. She thinks that boys her age are immature but helps her friends during their love troubles normally by acting like a love adviser, conveying the wisdom of her unseen elder sister, who has apparently had several boyfriends.

Cocoa is Hanabi's love rival for Yuuto. She does everything to become his girlfriend, including dishonest and ungainly means. In front of people, she acts sweet and innocent, but acts mean to make Hanabi lose her self-esteem and confidence. 

Hanabi's childhood friend who has just come back from Tokyo. He also wants to be her boyfriend.

Eikou is one of the biggest pranksters in Class 6-2. He teases girls, makes girls' popularity rankings (which winner is usually Cocoa) and collects Yuuto's "golden thoughts".

Tomoya is one of the biggest pranksters in Class 6-2. He teases girls, makes girls' popularity rankings (which winner is usually Cocoa) and collects Yuuto's "golden thoughts".

 (game); Shinnosuke Tachibana (TV series)
Inaba is a fellow student from Yui's cram school who took an interest in Yui after hearing that she had a boyfriend.

Media

Manga
Volumes
1 (March 1, 2013)
2 (July 1, 2013)
3 (November 29, 2013)
4 (July 1, 2014)
5 (October 30, 2014)
6 (February 27, 2015)
7 (July 27, 2015)
8 (December 23, 2015)
9 (April 27, 2016)
10 (November 29, 2016)
10.5 (December 26, 2016)
11 (March 2, 2017)
12 (July 21, 2017)
13 (November 29, 2017)
14 (March 30, 2018)
15 (August 1, 2018)
16 (February 27, 2019)
17 (July 1, 2019)
18 (October 31, 2019)
19 (December 26, 2019)
20 (July 1, 2020)

Anime

OVAs

First season

Second season

TV series
The TV anime is split into two seasons, the first half aired in April 2016, while the second half aired in October. The opening theme in episodes 1-12 is "Sweet Sensation" by Rie Murakawa, while the ending theme is "Cotona MODE" by AŌP and the opening theme in episodes 13-24 is "Ano ne, Kimi dake ni" by AŌP, while the ending theme is "Yuuki no Tsubasa" by Machico.

Reception
Volume 3 reached the 47th place on the weekly Oricon manga chart and, as of December 8, 2013, has sold 36,632 copies; volume 4 reached the 20th place and, as of July 13, 2014, has sold 53,162 copies; volume 5 reached the 38th place and, as of November 9, 2014, has sold 50,161 copies.

It was nominated for Best Children's Manga at the 38th Kodansha Manga Awards. In 2019, Age 12 won the 64th Shogakukan Manga Award for the children category.

References

External links
Official website 
Age 12: A Little Heart-Pounding anime  at Tokyo MX 

2014 video games
Adventure games
Nintendo 3DS games
Nintendo 3DS-only games
OLM, Inc.
Romance anime and manga
Romance video games
Slice of life anime and manga
Shogakukan manga
Shōjo manga
Video games developed in Japan
Winners of the Shogakukan Manga Award for children's manga